The Bouquinistes of Paris, France, are booksellers of used and antiquarian books who ply their trade along large sections of the banks of the Seine: on the right bank from the Pont Marie to the Quai du Louvre, and on the left bank from the Quai de la Tournelle to Quai Voltaire. The Seine is thus described as 'the only river in the world that runs between two bookshelves'.

History 

The tradition of the second-hand booksellers began around the 16th century with little market peddlers. Under pressure from booksellers, a settlement of 1649 prohibited stalls and the display of books on the Pont Neuf. The authorities at the time were rather anxious to limit parallel markets not subjected to official censorship. Travelling booksellers during the period were driven out and then reinstated under approval.

The traditional emblem of the second-hand booksellers is "a lizard looking at a sword".

The term "bouquiniste" appears in the dictionary of the Académie française in 1762.

In 1859, concessions were implemented by the city of Paris and the bouquinistes are permitted to be established at fixed points. Each one is entitled to 10 metres of railing for an annual fee of 26,35 F and a 25 F licence. The openings are from sunrise to sunset. Finally, in 1930 the dimensions of the "boxes" were fixed.

Installed along more than three kilometres of the Seine and declared a UNESCO World Heritage site, the 240 bouquinistes make use of 900 "green boxes" to house some 300,000 old books and a very great number of journals, stamps and trading cards.

The second-hand booksellers of Paris have inspired booksellers in other cities such as Ottawa, Beijing and Tokyo.

Excerpt from the "Rules of Bouquinistes" 

Article 9 of the by-law of October 1993, signed by Jacques Chirac:

The boxes used by book stores will be of a type approved by the Administration with an external bodywork determined by the dimensions below, for a maximum length of 8.6 metres:
 Length: 2 metres
 Width: 0.75 metres
 Height:
Seine side: 0.6 metres
Shore side: 0.35 metres
 (These dimensions are for closed boxes, lids included).
 During use, the upper edge of the opened box should not reach over 2.1 metres above the ground.

In popular culture
 The Bookseller (2012), a mystery novel by Mark Pryor (Seventh Street Books, Amherst, NY), features a bouquiniste character named Max Koche.

See also
 Books in France

References

Bookstores of Paris
Tourist attractions in Paris